Berta Ambrož (29 October 1944 – 1 July 2003) was a Yugoslav Slovene singer. She is best known for representing Yugoslavia in the Eurovision Song Contest 1966 with the song "Brez besed" (Without Words).

References

External links 

1944 births
2003 deaths
Eurovision Song Contest entrants for Yugoslavia
Eurovision Song Contest entrants of 1966
Musicians from Kranj
Yugoslav women singers